Allosteric enzymes are enzymes that change their conformational ensemble upon binding of an effector (allosteric modulator)  which results in an apparent change in binding affinity at a different ligand binding site. This "action at a distance" through binding of one ligand affecting the binding of another at a distinctly different site, is the essence of the allosteric concept. Allostery plays a crucial role in many fundamental biological processes, including but not limited to cell signaling and the regulation of metabolism. Allosteric enzymes need not be oligomers as previously thought, and in fact many systems have demonstrated allostery within single enzymes.
In biochemistry, allosteric regulation (or allosteric control) is the regulation of a protein by binding an effector molecule at a site other than the enzyme's active site.

The site to which the effector binds is termed the allosteric site. Allosteric sites allow effectors to bind to the protein, often resulting in a conformational change involving protein dynamics. Effectors that enhance the protein's activity are referred to as allosteric activators, whereas those that decrease the protein's activity are called allosteric inhibitors. 

Allosteric regulations are a natural example of control loops, such as feedback from downstream products or feedforward from upstream substrates. Long-range allostery is especially important in cell signaling. Allosteric regulation is also particularly important in the cell's ability to adjust enzyme activity.

The term allostery comes from the Greek allos (ἄλλος), "other," and stereos (στερεὀς), "solid (object)." This is in reference to the fact that the regulatory site of an allosteric protein is physically distinct from its active site.

The protein catalyst (enzyme) may be part of a 
multi-subunit complex, and/or may transiently 
or permanently associate with a Cofactor 
(e.g. adenosine triphosphate). Catalysis of biochemical reactions is vital due to the very low reaction rates of the uncatalysed 
reactions. A key driver of protein evolution is the optimization of such catalytic 
activities via protein dynamics.

Whereas enzymes without coupled domains/subunits display normal Michaelis-Menten kinetics, most allosteric enzymes have multiple coupled domains/subunits and show cooperative binding.  Generally speaking, such cooperativity results in allosteric enzymes displaying a sigmoidal dependence on the concentration of their substrates in positively cooperative systems. This allows most allosteric enzymes to greatly vary catalytic output in response to small changes in effector concentration. Effector molecules, which may be the substrate itself (homotropic effectors) or some other small molecule (heterotropic effector), may cause the enzyme to become more active or less active by redistributing the ensemble between the higher affinity and lower affinity states. The binding sites for heterotropic effectors, called allosteric sites, are usually separate from the active site yet thermodynamically coupled. Allosteric Database (ASD, http://mdl.shsmu.edu.cn/ASD)  provides a central resource for the display, search and analysis of the structure, function and related annotation for allosteric molecules, including allosteric enzymes and their modulators. Each enzyme is annotated with detailed description of allostery, biological process and related diseases, and each modulator with binding affinity, physicochemical properties and therapeutic area.

Kinetic properties

Hemoglobin, though not an enzyme, is the canonical example of an allosteric protein molecule - and one of the earliest to have its crystal structure solved (by Max Perutz).  More recently, the E. coli enzyme aspartate carbamoyltransferase (ATCase)  has become another good example of allosteric regulation.

The kinetic properties of allosteric enzymes are often explained in terms of a conformational change between a low-activity, low-affinity "tense" or T state and a high-activity, high-affinity "relaxed" or R state.  These structurally distinct enzyme forms have been shown to exist in several known allosteric enzymes.

However the molecular basis for conversion between the two states is not well understood.  Two main models have been proposed to describe this mechanism: the "concerted model" of Monod, Wyman, and Changeux, and the "sequential model" of Koshland, Nemethy, and Filmer.

In the concerted model, the protein is thought to have two “all-or-none” global states.   This model is supported by positive cooperativity where binding of one ligand increases the ability of the enzyme to bind to more ligands. The model is not supported by negative cooperativity where losing one ligand makes it easier for the enzyme to lose more.

In the sequential model there are many different global conformational/energy states. Binding of one ligand changes the enzyme so it can bind more ligands more easily, i.e. every time it binds a ligand it wants to bind another one.

Neither model fully explains allosteric binding, however.  The recent combined use of physical techniques (for example, x-ray crystallography and solution small angle x-ray scattering or SAXS) and genetic techniques (site-directed mutagenesis or SDM) may improve our understanding of allostery.

References

External links 
Biochemistry 6th Ed, Stryer Berg and Tymoczko

Enzymes